Mazur is a Polish folk and ballroom dance with origins in the region of Mazovia, performed in 3/4 or 3/8 time and lively tempo. It is one of the five Polish national dances.

The Mazur was known in Poland already in the 15th century and by the 17th century it became a popular court dance. It is characterised by its tendency to accent the second or third beat and a rhythmic figure of a 4-syllable group, consisting of two quavers (eighth notes) and two crotchets (quarter notes), and is a joyful, dynamic dance. The man leading the Mazur is called a "wodzirej".

See also
Mazurka

References

Polish dances